La Silsa is a neighborhood in Caracas, Venezuela.

The neighborhood is considered to be a slum with a high crime rate.

References

External links
 Evaluation of the Telematics Network Consortium La Silsa-La Moran

Neighborhoods in Venezuela